Ian "Lemmy" Kilmister was a British rock musician.

Lemmy may also refer to:
 Lemmy (film), about the British rock musician.
 A partial beard style, similar to a Hulihee, named for Lemmy Kilmister's facial hair.
 Brian Lemmy (born 1937), an English cricketer.
 Lemmy Koopa, one of the Super Mario Bros. Koopalings characters, named after Lemmy Kilmister.

 Lemmy pour les dames (1962), French Eurospy film directed by Bernard Borderie.
 Lemmy Caution, the main character in the film above.
 Lemuel "Lemmy" Barnet, a character in the 1950s BBC Radio serial Journey into Space.
 Lemmy (software), a self-hosted social link-aggregation and discussion platform.